Arndale Centres were the first "American style" malls to be built in the United Kingdom. In total, 23 Arndales have been built in the United Kingdom, and three in Australia. The first opened in Jarrow, County Durham, in 1961, as a pedestrianised shopping area.

History

Shortly after the end of World War II, Arnold Hagenbach, a baker with a talent for property investment, and Sam Chippendale, an estate agent from Otley, set up a company called the Arndale Property Trust, the name being a portmanteau of "Arnold" and "Chippendale".

The trust purchased Bradford's Victorian Swan Arcade in 1954, with the intention of demolishing it and developing a new shopping centre, but it took eight years before leases expired and building work could commence, so in the meantime it developed a site in Jarrow, County Durham, which became the first Arndale Centre when it opened in 1961. Its trademark Viking statue, built by the Trust, was unveiled on 17 February 1962.

When the Wandsworth Arndale opened in 1971, it was the largest indoor shopping space in Europe. 

The largest Arndale Centre built was Manchester Arndale. It was redeveloped from 1996, after being badly damaged in an IRA bombing, and the centre has been owned by Prudential since December 1998.

Criticism
Arndale Centres attracted criticism on aesthetic grounds as they replaced old buildings – often of the Victorian period – with modern concrete constructions, often in a brutalist style.

The value of the Wandsworth Arndale was maximised by the high rise tower blocks built on top of the mall, which helped it to become, according to some commentators, "one of London’s great architectural disasters".

List of Arndale Centres

United Kingdom
Aberdeen – now known as Mastrick Shopping Centre
Accrington, Arndale House – built in 1961 on Broadway; Arndale Centre opened October 1987
Blackburn Arndale House – demolished in 2008 for the extension of The Mall Blackburn
Bolton – now known as Crompton Place Shopping Centre
Bradford – now known as Kirkgate Shopping Centre
Dartford – now known as Priory Shopping Centre
Doncaster – now known as Frenchgate Shopping Centre
Eastbourne – now known as The Beacon
Jarrow – now known as the Viking Centre
Keighley – now known as the Airedale Centre
Lancaster – demolished to make way for a market building, later replaced by a Primark store
Leeds, Armley – shopping precinct no longer carries a name; shop addresses usually referred to as Town Street
Leeds, Cross Gates – now known as Crossgates Shopping Centre
Leeds, Headingley – now known as Headingley Central
Liverpool – Arndale House on Pembroke Road
Longbenton – on West Farm Avenue, Newcastle upon Tyne. Built in 1962 and demolished in 2004
Luton – purchased in 2006 by The Mall Company, and now known as The Mall Luton
Manchester – the largest of the Arndale Centres
Middleton – now known as Middleton Shopping Centre
Morecambe – on Market Street
Nelson – now known as the Pendle Rise Shopping Centre, previously Admiral Shopping Centre
Nottingham – known as the Broadmarsh Centre, now demolished
Poole – now known as the Dolphin Shopping Centre
Shipley – on Market Street
Sunderland – on High Street West
Stretford – now known as Stretford Mall
Wandsworth – now known as Southside
Wellingborough – now known as Swansgate Shopping Centre

Australia
Adelaide – Kilkenny – now known as Armada Arndale 
Adelaide – Oaklands Park – previously known as Marion Arndale, now Westfield Marion
Frenchs Forest – now known as Forestway Shopping Centre
Springwood, Queensland – on Cinderella Drive

References in popular culture
The phrase "the Arndale Centre wasn't built in a day" (in place of "Rome wasn't built in a day") was used in the film Little Voice. A sketch in an episode of A Bit of Fry & Laurie about greetings cards with very specific tailored messages inside features a card with the greeting "Sorry to hear your teeth fell out in the Arndale Centre". Numerous other references to Arndale Centres exist in the show.

In an episode of The Royle Family, Nana is said to have a "spin out" outside Timpson's Shoe Shop (now closed) in the Stretford Arndale or precinct as it is known locally. British band Squeeze referenced the mall in the song "It's Not Cricket", from their 1979 album, Cool for Cats, with the lyrics: "at the Arndale Centre, she's up against the wall."

On his track the N. W. R. A. on The Fall's 1980 album Grotesque (After the Gramme), Manchester singer Mark E. Smith described the destruction of the Arndale as part of an apocalyptic 'future rising' of the North. 

In the first Christmas special episode of The Worst Week of My Life, "The Worst Christmas of my Life", Howard refers to visiting Santa's Grotto at the Arndale Centre. In series four, episode four "It's Only Rock and Roll" of Only Fools And Horses, an Arndale Centre is mentioned, but it is not specific as to whether it is the Wandsworth or Dartford centre that is being referred to.

Characters in the television series Coronation Street occasionally reference going shopping in the Manchester Arndale Centre, the television series being set in Greater Manchester.

In the 2015 advert for Warburtons giant crumpets, the Muppets sing "it's time to hit the Arndale / to get some bigger plates".

References

External links
 The Times - Arnold Hagenbach Obituary

Shopping centres in the United Kingdom
Shopping centres in Australia